Ayas is a 2013 Turkish animated film produced by Düşyeri Animation Studios.  The film went on nationwide general release on November 22, 2013.

Plot 
The six-year-old Ayas comes from a huge family. Istanbul is his hometown, which he explores together with his sister and all his cousins. He is a curious, smart, cheerful little boy that never seems to get bored.

References

External links
 Teaser on YouTube

Turkish animated films